Colorado's 28th Senate district is one of 35 districts in the Colorado Senate. It has been represented by Democrat Rhonda Fields since 2023. Prior to redistricting the district was represented by Democrats Janet Buckner and Nancy Todd.

Geography
District 28 is based in southern Aurora, also covering parts of unincorporated Arapahoe County.

The district is located entirely within Colorado's 6th congressional district, and overlaps with the 36th, 40th, 41st, 42nd, and 56th districts of the Colorado House of Representatives.

Recent election results
Colorado state senators are elected to staggered four-year terms; under normal circumstances, the 28th district holds elections in presidential years.

2020

2016

2012

Federal and statewide results in District 28

References 

28
Arapahoe County, Colorado